Cerithiopsis greppii is a species of sea snail, a gastropod in the family Cerithiopsidae. It was described by Buzzurro and Cecalupo, in 2005 .

References

greppii
Gastropods described in 2005